Brearley is a surname that may refer to:
 David Brearley (1745–1790), delegate to the U.S. Constitutional Convention.
 Giles Brearley (born 1955), South Yorkshire local historian
 Harry Brearley (1871–1948), British chemist who invented stainless steel
 Herman Brearley (died 1940), English cathedral organist
 Horace Brearley (1913–2007), father of Mike
 John Brearley  (1875–1944), English soccer player
 Mike Brearley (born 1942), Middlesex and England cricketer, one of the most successful cricket captains of all time
 Norman Brearley (1890–1989), Australian aviation pioneer
 Roger Brearley (1586–1637), English clergyman
 Walter Brearley (1876–1937), Lancashire fast bowler

See also
 The Brearley School, a K-12 independent school for girls in New York City
 David Brearley High School, Kenilworth, New Jersey